The Fiat 515 is a passenger car produced by Fiat between 1931 and 1935. The 515 is a "hybrid", with a Fiat 514 engine in the larger 522 chassis.
The car was also made in a long version as the 515 L. This model was produced in 3400 examples.

References
Fiat Personenwagen, by Fred Steiningen, 1994. 

515
Cars introduced in 1931